Sissoi Veliky (Russian: Сисой Великий) may refer to:
 St. Sisoes the Great of Egypt, early Christian saint
 Sissoi Veliky (1788), Russian ship of the line
 Sissoi Veliky (1822), Russian ship of the line
 Sissoi Veliky (1849), Russian ship of the line
 Russian battleship Sissoi Veliky (1896), Russian battleship